Sir Charles Cowper,  (26 April 1807 – 19 October 1875) was an Australian politician and the Premier of New South Wales on five occasions from 1856 to 1870.

Cowper did useful work but does not rank among the more distinguished Australian politicians. Cowper's governments had a fairly coherent Liberal tendency, a trend which continued with the governments of Henry Parkes and later developed into the Free Trade Party. In 1852, Parkes referred in public to his "mild, affable and benignant character". In later years he spoke of his "quick insight in dealing with surrounding circumstances, and much good humour and tact in dealing with individuals". His political adroitness was such that it secured for him the popular sobriquet of "Slippery Charley". Probably Cowper deserved this title no more than Bishop Wilberforce deserved his of "Soapy Sam", but Rusden speaks of Cowper as "ever anxious to link himself with a majority" and frequently shows animus when speaking of him. He was personally popular, and towards the end of his life the estate of Wivenhoe was purchased by public subscription and settled on his wife.

Early life
Cowper was the third son of the Rev. William Cowper and his first wife Hannah. He was born in Drypool, Hull, Yorkshire, England and was brought to Sydney by his father in 1809. Educated by his father, in 1825 he was in the public service, and when barely 19 years of age was appointed clerk of the Clergy and School Lands Corporation. He held this position for some years and in 1831 married the second daughter of Daniel Sutton. When the Clergy and School Lands Corporation was dissolved in 1833, Cowper went on the land and held extensive properties in Cumberland and Argyle counties.

Legislative Council
Cowper was elected as the member for the County of Cumberland in the Legislative Council in 1843 after a bitter contest against James Macarthur and held his seat until 1850. In September 1848 he sent out a circular convening a meeting to consider the establishment of a railway company. The company was formed and the first railway in New South Wales was begun on 3 July 1849. It proved impossible for the company to finance the railway, and it was taken over by the government six years later.

After coming last in the election for the City of Sydney and failing to win County of Cumberland, at the end of 1851, Cowper was elected for County of Durham. He had opposed transportation since the 1840s and had presided at a public meeting protesting plans to revive transportation in October 1846. He also fought transportation vigorously in the Council and in May 1851 he became president of the Australasian League for the Abolition of Transportation, which included representatives of New South Wales, Tasmania, Victoria, South Australia and New Zealand. The association actively campaigned in Britain and, partly as a result, the British Government announced in December 1852 that there would be no more transportation to eastern Australia.

Premier

When responsible government was established, Cowper was elected a member of the first Legislative Assembly in 1856 for Sydney City, which he represented until its abolition in 1859.

Although Cowper was popular in 1856, his open association with the radicals, including Parkes, James Wilshire and Robert Campbell ruled him out from being considered for the premiership. He was offered and declined the position of Colonial Secretary in the first ministry under the leadership of S. A. Donaldson. Following Donaldson's resignation in August, Cowper was asked to form Government, but he had no more success than Donaldson in establishing majority support, and was in particular attacked over his choice for Attorney General, James Martin, who had not yet been admitted as a barrister. He was beaten in a no confidence motion and resigned on 2 October.

Cowper turned down a place in the Parker ministry. He subsequently opposed Parker's proposal to create 40 new members in the House, and distribute them according to population, because it did not widen the franchise.

Second ministry

In September 1857, the Parker Government was defeated and resigned, and Cowper became Premier again. This was a ministry of many changes, no fewer than 13 men holding the seven positions in its life of just over two years. In December, his Government lost a vote on a proposal to increase the rents of pastoralists and to levy an assessment on their stock, but this time Governor Denison agreed to call an election, held in January 1858. Cowper did well enough to remain Premier, but he did not have a reliable majority. His Government amended the Electoral Act to provide vote by secret ballot, universal manhood suffrage, representation primarily by population and more equal electoral districts. It also created 40 new municipalities, established district courts and prohibited grants to support public religious activity. At the June 1859 election, Cowper was returned for East Sydney. His government was beaten on a vote on his educational bill on 26 October 1859 and Cowper resigned from the Assembly the next day. William Forster became Premier and John Robertson became leader of the Opposition. In March 1860, Cowper was appointed to a five-year term in the Legislative Council.

Third ministry

Robertson formed Government in March 1860 with Cowper as Chief Secretary, and proceeded to bring forward his radical land legislation, involving free selection of crown land before survey and, when blocked in the Assembly, he called an election on the land issue in December. At the election, Cowper returned to the Assembly representing East Sydney. All the candidates who publicly opposed land reform and the abolition of state aid for religious purposes were defeated.

Robertson handed over the Premiership to Cowper on 10 January 1861, while Robertson concentrated on the land bills as Secretary for Lands. Cowper simplified the political situation by sending Parkes to England to recruit immigrants on £1,000 per year. Early in this year Cowper introduced a bill intended to substitute elected members for the nominee members of the Legislative Council. The Council suggested amendments which Cowper could not accept. Robertson had his land bills passed by the Assembly on 27 March and resigned from the Assembly so that he could be appointed to the Council on 3 April to complete the process. As the Council was resolutely opposed to the land bills, Robertson persuaded Cowper to ask the new Governor Sir John Young to swamp the Council with 21 new members. Before administering the oath to the new members the President of the Council, Sir W. W. Burton, announced his resignation and left the chamber. Other members followed his example, there was no quorum, and on the same day Parliament was prorogued. The five-year terms of the 1856 Council appointments had run out and the Governor appointed a new Council to life terms, including Robertson. The land bills were passed again by the Assembly in September and by the Council on October 1861. Subsequently, the Cowper Government also passed the Torrens title legislation and the abolition of state aid to religion, although it did not succeed in passing Cowper's education bill, which would have amalgamated the religious and government ("national") school systems. In October 1863, Cowper's government was defeated amidst criticism of its financial management and Martin became Premier.

Fourth ministry

Cowper's party won the February 1865 election and he became Premier for the fourth time, but he had difficulty in maintaining control of the Assembly. In January 1866 Martin and Parkes, who had returned from London, defeated him and he resigned his seat to look after his private interests in February 1867.

Fifth ministry

In the December 1869 election, he recontested East Sydney unsuccessfully, but was elected to represent Liverpool Plains. Cowper was Premier for the last time in January 1870 and was appointed Agent-General for New South Wales in London at the end of that year. He died in London on 19 October 1875 and was survived by Lady Cowper and children. He is buried in a family grave on the western side of Highgate Cemetery.

Honours
Cowper was made a Commander of the Order of St Michael and St George (CMG) in 1869, and a Knight Commander of the Order of St Michael and St George (KCMG) in 1872.

The federal Division of Cowper in New South Wales was created in 1900, and named after Sir Charles Cowper.

Notes

External links

 

1807 births
1875 deaths
Burials at Highgate Cemetery
Politicians from Kingston upon Hull
Premiers of New South Wales
Members of the New South Wales Legislative Assembly
Members of the New South Wales Legislative Council
Australian Knights Commander of the Order of St Michael and St George
Australian politicians awarded knighthoods
19th-century Australian politicians
Agents-General for New South Wales